Andrew Meredith (born 24 April 1972 in Adelaide, Australia) was the former Analysis Operations Manager at Premier League club Manchester United. Formerly Director of Performance Analysis and Innovation Architect at 2. Bundesliga club FC St. Pauli, Meredith was involved as Technical Analyst with the Australia national football team during their 2018 FIFA World Cup qualification campaign.

Meredith is a former FIH High Performance Field hockey Coach, who worked as an International Field hockey coach during the period 2004– 2013. Following an 8-year period as the former Assistant Coach of the Germany national field hockey team, where he assisted the German National coaches, Bernhard Peters in the period 2004–2006, and Markus Weise 2006–2012, Meredith was named as National Coach of the Ireland national field hockey team for a 14-month period in October 2012 before moving to professional Football in Germany.

Hockey 
Meredith was a member of the German Men's Hockey Team during a significantly successful period, winning gold in Field hockey at the 2008 Summer Olympics in Beijing, gold in Field hockey at the 2012 Summer Olympics in London, gold at the 2006 Men's Hockey World Cup in Mönchengladbach. gold at the 2007 Men's Hockey Champions Trophy in Kuala Lumpur, and the gold medal at the 2011 Men's EuroHockey Nations Championship in Mönchengladbach.

During his period as Ireland coach the team finished third at the 2012 Men's Hockey Champions Challenge I and 7th at the 2012–13 Men's FIH Hockey World League Semifinals.

Football 
October 2013, saw him engaged as a High Performance consultant for the Hamburg Bundesliga Football club FC St. Pauli, which later led to an expanded full-time role in December 2013 where he was contracted as Innovation Architect and Head of Performance Analysis until August 2019.

March 2015, Meredith began his involvement with the Australian National Football team the Socceroos in a friendly match against Germany and was retained for the 2018 World Cup Qualifiers.

In September 2019, Meredith joined Manchester United in the club’s Managerial Department, taking up the role of Analysis Operations Manager, which sees him focus on the strategic level responsibilities of analysis provision and innovation architecture within the First Team, Academy and Women’s program, and, the management of club resources.

Family 
Andrew Meredith is the son of Dennis Meredith , the former Australian Hockey Player, international umpire and umpire's manager, and the competition and Events Manager for the International Hockey Federation from the period 2001 to 2010.

References

FC St Pauli
2012 Irish Men's National Team
2005 German Men's National Team 
2008 Olympic German Men's National Team 
2010 World Cup German Men's National Team
Deutscher Hockey-Bund

External links
Olympic gold medal coach confirms he is joining Manchester United
Manchester United wirbt St. Pauli-Analysten ab 
Er ist das Auge von St. Pauli 
FC St. Pauli: Hinter den Kulissen 
Das dritte und vierte Auge des Trainers 
Andrew Meredith Er ist das Auge von St.Pauli 
Hockeytrainer macht Fussballprofis beim FC St Pauli schlau 
Lienen Schwärmt von Video-Guru Meredith 
Andrew Meredith entgeht beim FC St Pauli nichts 
"Deutschland ist meine Heimat geworden" 
BBC Sport - Meredith Steps down from Ireland to work in Football
Inside Sport-interview with Andrew Meredith National Men's Hockey Coach
BBC Sport - Ireland name Andrew Meredith as new men's coach
Irish Hockey Announce Andrew Meredith as Men's National Coach
 die "Tor-Professoren" 
Wenn der Australier lächelt... 
Germans pad up for hockey practice, cricket style
2008 Olympic Profile 
2010 World Cup German Men's National Team
Andrew Meredith

Living people
1972 births
Australian male field hockey players
Ireland men's national field hockey team coaches
Australian field hockey coaches